Stephen Alford FRHistS (born 1970) is a British historian and academic. He has been professor of early modern British history at the University of Leeds since 2012. Educated at the University of St Andrews, he was formerly a British Academy Post-doctoral Research Fellow at the University of Cambridge (1997–99) and junior research fellow of Fitzwilliam College, Cambridge and, between 1999 and 2012, a fellow in history at King's College, Cambridge. He has been a fellow of the Royal Historical Society since 2000. He was taught by John Guy.

Selected publications
The Early Elizabethan Polity: William Cecil and the British Succession Crisis, 1558-1569. Cambridge University Press, 1998.
Kingship and Politics in the Reign of Edward VI. Cambridge University Press, 2002.
Burghley: William Cecil at the Court of Elizabeth I. Yale University Press, New Haven, 2008. 
The Watchers: A Secret History of the Reign of Elizabeth I. Allen Lane, 2012. 
Edward VI: The last boy king. Allen Lane, 2014. 
London's Triumph: Merchant Adventurers and the Tudor City. Allen Lane, 2017.

References 

Living people
1970 births
Fellows of King's College, Cambridge
Academics of the University of Leeds
Fellows of the Royal Historical Society
Alumni of the University of St Andrews